Jayanga Peiris (born 6 September 1995) is a Sri Lankan cricketer. He made his Twenty20 debut for Panadura Sports Club in the 2018–19 SLC Twenty20 Tournament on 16 February 2019.

References

External links
 

1995 births
Living people
Sri Lankan cricketers
Panadura Sports Club cricketers
Place of birth missing (living people)